Raaz is a 1957 Pakistani suspense thriller film directed by Humayun Mirza. It stars Ejaz Durrani, Musarrat Nazir, Allauddin and Shamim Ara. The film revolves around a police officer who left his job to prove the innocence of his friend who is alleged of a murder.

At the annual Nigar Awards ceremony, it received two awards, including Best Film of 1959.

Plot 
A passenger gets caught by police with a corpse in the box. The passenger's friend, who is in police tries to free him from this trouble but losses his job due to being biased towards the alleged murder. The slain's daughter visits the police station regularly but couldn't be satisfied until Inspector ensures her his support.

Cast 
 Ejaz Durrani
 Musarrat Nazir
 Allauddin
 Shamim Ara
 Diljeet Mirza
 Rekha
 Saqi
 Bibbo
 Sultan Rahi

Soundtrack 
The music of the film was composed by Feroz Nizami and, lyrics were penned by Kaleem Usmani and Tufail Ahmed Jamali.

Tracklist 
 Aye Zindagi Rulaye Ja, Qissa-e-gham Sunaye Ja sung by Mubarak Begum
 Bach Ke Zara, Hat Ke Badmast Raho sung by Mubarak Khan
 Chal Na Sakay Gi 420 sung by Ahmed Rushdi
 Maan, Maan, Maan, Zamana Hai Jawan by Mubarak Begum and Ahmed Rushdi
 Meethi Meethi Baton Se Jiya Na Jala sung by Zubaida Khanum
 Mast Nazar, Mori Hai Patli Kamar sung by Mubarak Begum

Relsase and box office 
The film was released on 18 June 1959 and ran for 50 weeks in theaters.

Awards 
At annual Nigar Awards, it received two awards including, Best Film.

References 

Pakistani thriller films
1950s Urdu-language films
Urdu-language Pakistani films
Pakistani black-and-white films
Nigar Award winners